The collection of the Marciana Library contains 4,639 manuscripts and 13,117 manuscript volumes. Its historical nucleus is the private collection of Cardinal Bessarion, which was donated to the Republic of Venice in 1468.

Manuscripts

Some significant manuscripts in the collection include:

Greek
 Gr. Z. 196 (=743): commentary by Olympiodorus on Plato's Gorgias and Alcibiades (ninth century) on-line
 Gr. Z. 228 (=406): includes Books I and II of Peri Psychēs by Aristotle with commentary by Simplicius of Cilicia and Sophonias and paraphrases by Themistius together with commentary by Pseudo-Diadochus on Plato's Timaeus, commentary by Simplicius of Cilicia on Aristotle's Peri Ouranoû, commentary by Ammonius Hermiae’s on Plato’s Phaedrus, and commentary by Proclus on Plato’s Parmenides. (fourteenth century) on-line
 Gr. Z. 313 (=690): Mathematiké sýntaxis by Ptolemy (tenth century)
 Gr. Z. 388 (=333): Geōgraphikḕ Hyphḗgēsis by Ptolemy with 27 map projections, commissioned by Bessarion and attributed to John Rhosos (fifteenth century)
 Gr. Z. 395 (=921): Romaiki istoria by Cassius Dio, the oldest manuscript containing Books XLIV, 35, 4–LX, 28, 3 (ninth century)
 Gr. Z. 447 (=820): Deipnosophistaí by Athenaeus of Naucratis, the oldest surviving and most complete extant text (tenth century) on-line
 Gr. Z. 453 (=821): "Homerus Venetus B" (eleventh century) on-line
 Gr. Z. 454 (=822): "Homerus Venetus A", text of Homer's Iliás epic with  annotations, glosses, and commentaries (tenth century) on-line
 Gr. Z. 460 (=330): commentary on Homer's Odýsseia by Eustathius of Thessalonica, autograph copy (twelfth century)
 Gr. Z. 479 (=881): Cynegetica by Oppian of Apamea and Vita Oppiani by Constantine Manasses, the oldest illustrated version with 150 miniatures (eleventh century)
 Gr. Z. 481 (=863): Anthologia Planudea, autograph copy of Greek epigrams by Maximus Planudes (1299–1301) on-line

Italian
 It. VIII, 2 (=2796): De architectura by Antonio Averulino, commissioned for Matthias Corvinus and illustrated with 152 designs (fifteenth century) on-line
 It. IX, 276 (=6902): Divina Commedia by Dante Alighieri, illuminated with 170 miniatures (fourteenth century) on-line

Latin
 Lat. Z. 549 (=1597): "Codex Cumanicus", handbook of the Cuman language for missionaries with glossaries and a collection of religious texts, linguistic data, and folkloric materials (fourteenth century) on-line
 Lat. I, 99 (=2138): "Breviarium Grimani", Breviary illuminated by the Flemish miniaturists Gerard Horenbout and Alexander and Simon Bening, once belonging to Cardinal Domenico Grimani (c. 1515–1520) on-line
 Lat. I, 103 (=11925): "Evangelistarium Grimani", Gospel illuminated by Benedetto Bordone and Giulio Clovio for Cardinal Marino Grimani (1528) on-line
 Lat. VI, 86 (=2593): De remediis by Francesco Petrarch and Cato Maior de senectute by Cicero (fourteenth century)
 Lat. VI, 254 (=2976): Historia naturalis by Pliny the Elder, illuminated copy  commissioned by Pico della Mirandola (1481)
 Lat. XII, 68 (=4519): De bello punico by Silius Italicus, illuminated by Zanobi Strozzi and Francesco Pesellino (fifteenth century) on-line
 Lat. XIV, 35 (=4054): De nuptiis Philologiae et Mercurii by Martianus Capella, illuminated by Attavante degli Attavanti for Matthias Corvinus (fifteenth century) on-line

Oriental languages
 Or. 90 (= 57): İskendernâme by Taceddin İbrahim bin Hizir Ahmedî, illuminated Ottoman version of the Alexander Romance (fifteenth century)

Biblical manuscripts
Old Testament
 Gr. Z. 1 (=320): Old Testament (beginning with the Book of Job), companion to the Vatican codice Vat. Gr. 2106 (eighth century) on-line
 Gr. Z. 17 (=421): "Psalmi cum catena", the 150 Psalms with commentary and illustrations, (tenth-early eleventh century) on-line
 Gr. Z. 538 (=540): "Catena in Job", text of the Book of Job with catena and 30 miniatures (905)

New Testament

 Uncial 030
 Uncial 0243
 Minuscule 205
 Minuscule 207
 Minuscule 208
 Minuscule 209
 Minuscule 210
 Minuscule 211
 Minuscule 212
 Minuscule 213
 Minuscule 214
 Minuscule 215
 Minuscule 217
 Minuscule 354
 Minuscule 355
 Minuscule 357
 Minuscule 405
 Minuscule 406
 Minuscule 407
 Minuscule 408
 Minuscule 409
 Minuscule 410
 Minuscule 411
 Minuscule 412
 Minuscule 413
 Minuscule 414
 Minuscule 415
 Minuscule 416
 Minuscule 417
 Minuscule 418
 Minuscule 419
 Minuscule 599
 Minuscule 891
 Minuscule 893
 Lectionary 107
 Lectionary 108
 Lectionary 109
 Lectionary 110
 Lectionary 139
 Lectionary 140
 Lectionary 141
 Lectionary 142
 Lectionary 264
 Lectionary 265
 Lectionary 266
 Lectionary 267
 Lectionary 268
 Lectionary 269

Cartography
 Fra Mauro map 
 It. Z. 76 (=4783): "Bianco world map", nautical atlas by Andrea Bianco with eight portolan charts and two world maps (1436) on-line
 It. VI, 213 (=5982): "Corbitis Atlas" (early fifteenth century) on-line

Music manuscripts
There are some important music manuscripts. The composers represented include:
Francesco Cavalli operas (from the collection of mostly Venetian opera manuscripts amassed by Marco Contarini, which was donated to the Biblioteca Marciana in 1843). Works include La Calisto (1651) and Erismena (1655, 1670). 
Domenico Scarlatti keyboard sonatas (volumes acquired from the singer Farinelli).

Notes

References 
 Labowsky, Lotte, Bessarion's Library and the Biblioteca Marciana, Six Early Inventories (Rome: Storia e Letteratura, 1979) 
 Raines, Dorit, 'Book Museum or Scholarly Library? The ‘Libreria di San Marco’ in a Republican Context', Ateneo veneto, CXCVII, terza serie, 9/II (2010), 31–50
 Rapp, Claudia, 'Bessarion of Nicaea', in Anthony Grafton, Glenn W. Most, and Salvatore Settis, ed., The Classical Tradition (Cambridge, MA: The Belknap Press of Harvard University Press, 2010), pp. 125–126 
 Zanetti, Antonio Maria, ed., Græca D. Marci Bibliotheca codicum manu scriptorum per titulos digesta (Venetiis: Casparis Ghirardi & Simonem Occhi, 1740)
 Zanetti, Antonio Maria, ed., Latina et italica D. Marci Bibliotheca codicum manu scriptorum per titulos digesta (Venetiis: Casparis Ghirardi & Simonem Occhi, 1741)
 Zorzi, Marino, Biblioteca Marciana Venezia (Firenze: Nardini, 1988)

External links 
 
  
 Catalogue of Greek codices 
 Catalogue of Latin codices (includes French and Italian codices) 

Archives in Italy
Marciana
National libraries in Italy
Manuscripts by collection